Oshe may refer to:
 oshe, the double-headed axe of Shango

The acronym OSHE may refer to:
 Occupational Safety, Health, and Environment

See also 
 Osh, Kyrgyzstan
 OSH (disambiguation)
 Oche (disambiguation)